The Herder Prize, named after the German philosopher Johann Gottfried Herder (1744–1803), was a prestigious international prize awarded every year from 1964 to 2006 to scholars and artists from Central and Southeast Europe whose life and work have contributed to the cultural understanding of European countries and their peaceful interrelations. Established in 1963, the first prizes were awarded in 1964.

The prize jury was composed of German and Austrian universities. Financing for the Prize, which amounted to €15,000, was sponsored by the Alfred Toepfer Foundation based in Hamburg. The awards were traditionally presented in an annual ceremony at the University of Vienna and handed over by the President of Austria. Each prize also included a one-year scholarship at an Austrian university given to a young person nominated by the winning scholar.

The prize was open to humanities scholars and artists from a wide variety of fields, including ethnographers, writers, architects, composers, poets, folklorists, painters, historians, literary scholars, art historians, archeologists, theatre directors, musicologists, museologists, linguists, playwrights, etc. Several writers who received the Herder Prize went on to later win the Nobel Prize in Literature, such as Wisława Szymborska (in 1995 and 1996), Imre Kertész (in 2000 and 2002), and Svetlana Alexievich (in 1999 and 2015), and many other recipients received other international accolades and were members of their national academies.

Since its inception the prize was open to scholars and artists from seven central and southeast, mostly communist, European countries (Bulgaria, Czechoslovakia, Greece, Hungary, Poland, Romania and Yugoslavia). After the fall of communism in Europe in the late 1980s and the subsequent turmoil which led to the breakup of Yugoslavia, the dissolution of the Soviet Union and the dissolution of Czechoslovakia, scholars from all the succeeding countries remained eligible for the prize. In the early 1990s several ex-Soviet European countries (the Baltic nations of Estonia, Latvia, and Lithuania; Belarus, and Ukraine) as well as Albania were also made eligible.

Usually seven recipients would be announced every year, except in 1964 (four), 1977 (eight), 1993 (nine), and in 2006 (five) — which was also the last edition of the Herder Prize. In 2007 the prize was discontinued and merged with other prize funds sponsored by the Alfred Toepfer Foundation to create a new Europe-wide annual award, the KAIROS Prize, worth €75,000 and given to a single artist every year to encourage their innovative work.

List of recipients

See also

 List of social sciences awards
 List of general awards in the humanities

External links
Alfred Töpfer Foundation official website 
Complete list of winners at Österreich-Bibliotheken.at 
Awards established in 1963
Cultural studies awards
Humanities awards
Social sciences awards
European awards
Awards disestablished in 2007
Austrian awards
German awards
1963 establishments in Austria
1963 establishments in Germany
2007 disestablishments in Austria
2007 disestablishments in Germany
Johann Gottfried Herder